Johann Baptist Gänsbacher (8 May 1778 in Sterzing – 13 July 1844 in Vienna), Austrian musical composer, was born in 1778 in Sterzing in the County of Tyrol.

His father, a schoolmaster and teacher of music, undertook his son's early education, which the boy continued under various masters until 1802, when he became the pupil of the celebrated Abbé G. J. Vogler.

To his connection with this artist and with his fellow pupils, more perhaps than to his own merits, Gänsbacher's permanent place in the history of music is due; for it was during his second stay with Vogler, then (1810) living at Darmstadt, that he became acquainted with Weber and Meyerbeer, and the close friendship which sprang up among the three young musicians, and was dissolved by death only, has become celebrated in the history of their art. But Gänsbacher was himself by no means without merit.

In 1823-24, he was one of the 50 composers who composed a variation on a waltz by Anton Diabelli for Vaterländischer Künstlerverein.

He creditably filled the responsible and difficult post of director of the music at St. Stephen's Cathedral, from 1823 until his death in Vienna; and his compositions show high gifts and accomplishment. They consist chiefly of church music, 17 masses, besides litanies, motets, offertories, etc., being among the number. He also wrote several sonatas, a symphony, and one or two minor compositions of a dramatic kind.

References

External links 
 

1778 births
1844 deaths
18th-century Austrian people
18th-century classical composers
18th-century Austrian male musicians
19th-century Austrian people
19th-century classical composers
Austrian conductors (music)
Male conductors (music)
People from Sterzing
Austrian Romantic composers
Austrian male classical composers
19th-century male musicians